Bel Ami is a British five part television costume drama based on the 1885 French novel Bel-Ami by Guy de Maupassant. It aired in 1971 on BBC 2. The series starred Robin Ellis as Georges Duroy, John Bryans as Monsieur Walter, Margaret Courtenay as Madame Walter, Elvi Hale as Clotilde de Marelle, Garfield Morgan as Jacques Rivat, Suzanne Neve as Madeleine Forestier, and Maurice Quick as Duroy's manservant. British television historian Claire Monk wrote, "BBC Two's five-part Bel Ami indicatively exhibited the sexual attitudes of its time in its makers' insistence that the story of penniless opportunist Georges Duroy— a social outsider in Parisian society who ruthlessly uses sex to pursue his ambitions— as basically a comedy with the charms of a fantasy world."

References

External links
 

British drama television series
Works based on Bel-Ami